Jama Masjid is a mosque located in Mominpura, Nagpur. 

The mosque has four minarets, a garden to the north, and a vehicle parking area to the south. Jama Masjid is situated 1.5 km east of Nagpur Railway Station in the Mominpura area.

See also 
 Mominpura, Nagpur
 Gharib Nawaz Mosque

References 

Mosques in Nagpur
Nagpur